Reynolds is a surname in the English language. Among the earliest recorded use of the surname is from the early 14th century.

English Reynolds

Reynolds is a patronymic surname meaning "son of Reynold", where the given name of the father, "Reynold", or "Reginald", was a Germanic name composed of *raginą + *waldą, meaning "Powerful Ruler" (possibly an alteration of the Old French name Reinold). The addition of "s" to the father's first name makes Reynolds a simple genitive case patronymic.

Possessors of these names arrived in England with the Norman Conquest of 1066,
and early English chronicles indicate a Norman origin, with the name appearing in England from about 1066. Early records of the name mention Willemus filius Raunaldi who was listed in the Domesday Book of 1086, in which "Rainald-us" is a common Christian name. The alternative Saxon origin is less commonly cited (in this etymology, the name is constructed from the Saxon words Rhein, pure, and hold, love).

The name Reynolds appeared in many references, but spellings included Reynell, Reynalds,  Renals, Rennels and many more. Scribes recorded and spelled the name as it sounded. Hence, a person would appear to be born with one spelling, married with another, and buried with still another.

Reynolds emerged as a notable family name in the county of Somerset where Sir Richard Reynell (died pre-1213) was seated at Pitney in Somerset and was given custody of the Castles at Exeter and Launceston by King Richard I when he went to the Holy Land in 1191. In 1198 Godfrey, Robert and Torketil Renoldus were registered in Normandy.

Meanwhile, many of the junior branches had joined the Earl of Pembroke's Irish invasion, where they became the Earls of Cavan, of Lisburne, of Mountmorris. In England the main line was forfeited but Sir Richard's son recovered the lands. This distinguished west country family also branched to other locations in England, mostly under the name Reynolds; for example, Walter Reynolds (died 1327) was the son of a Windsor baker, who became the favourite of King Edward II and Archbishop of Canterbury (1313–1327).

During the 12th century many of these Norman families moved north to Scotland in the train of the Earl of Huntingdon, later to become King David of Scotland.

In Ireland, settlers became known as the "Adventurers for land." They "undertook" to keep the Protestant faith, and were granted lands previously held by the Irish. This family migrated to Ireland during two periods, first with the Anglo-Norman invasion of Ireland, and later, in the 17th century giving rise to the Reynells of Reynell castle. In some cases it is difficult to distinguish early migrants from native Irish Reynolds who derive their name from McRannell, formerly spelled "Mac Ragnaill".

Among colonisers of North America bearing the family name Reynolds were Henry, Samuel, Thomas Reynold who joined the colonisation of the Barbados in 1688; Christopher Reynolds settled in Virginia in 1622; Nathaniel Reynold settled in Salem in 1630; Robert Reynolds settled in Salem in 1630 with Mary and his four children; Cornelius, Edward, George, Hannah, James, Mary, Nicholas, Richard Reynolds also settled in Virginia. During the American War of Independence some declared their loyalty to the Crown and moved into Canada as United Empire Loyalists.

More recently, notable bearers of the Reynolds surname include: Sir Joshua Reynolds (1723–1792), painter; John Reynolds (US politician) (1788–1865), American politician, Governor of Illinois; James Clark McReynolds (1862–1946), US Attorney General (1913–14) and Associate Justice of the US Supreme Court (1914–41); Albert Reynolds (1932-2014), Irish politician, Prime Minister of the Republic of Ireland (1992–95); Debbie Reynolds (1932–2016), American actress, dancer and singer; Christopher Reynolds, Australian Archbishop of Adelaide (1873–1893); as well as Burt Reynolds (1936–2018), American actor.
Rebecca Reynolds moved to New York then to Atlanta from Sydney Australia.
The most ancient grant  of a Coat of Arms found was a silver shield with a portcullis and three blue bars; A fox was the canting crest (French: renard = fox).

Mottos 
The ancient family Motto for this distinguished name was:
Jus meum tuebor ("I will defend my right")

Or, "Favente Deo ("With God favouring").

Irish Reynolds

In Ireland, the Reynolds surname originates from Muintir Eolais, the primary Conmaicne sept of south County Leitrim. 

Throughout Ireland's rich history, the Reynolds family name was a prominent one, and even today County Leitrim is the principal stronghold of the name, nearly half the people in Ireland so called hailing from that area.

In the Irish language, the surname is rendered Mac Raghnaill, and the name is ultimately derived from the Old Norse Rognvald a Latin borrowing of the two words regal and valor. It was also a surname of Irish Huguenots who came to Ireland from France to evade religious persecution in the 1600s; The original French surnames being either Renaud or Renault; Or a combination of both, respectively.

Like many Irish families, the Reynolds began emigrating from Ireland in two fronts: early in America's history, as they settled in the northeast prior to the American Revolution; and later, in the 19th century, during the Great Irish Hunger, when millions of Irish Catholics came to North America. The first wave of Irish immigrants were mostly Anglo-Irish Protestant converts from the north of Ireland, which differentiates them distinctly from the second wave of refugees from the Great Famine of Ireland, who were evidently Roman Catholic and from Mainland Ireland.

There is also a branch of the family which traces its origin to Phillipe D'Reynald, a templar knight who was required to return from the Holy Land and take up the legacy of his deceased brother William. However, this branch is more difficult to locate but is believed to have moved through Normandy and Somerset and on to Ireland.

Some of the better-known Irish Reynolds include:

 Alan Reynolds (footballer) (born 1974), retired Irish footballer and assistant with Derry City F.C
 Albert Reynolds (1932–2014), eighth Taoiseach of Ireland and fifth leader of Fianna Fáil
 Charles Reynolds (cleric), (born 1496/1497), Irish cleric, Archdeacon, Chaplin, and "traitor" who opposed Henry VIII of England.
 Gerry Reynolds (Irish politician) (born 1961)
 James Henry Reynolds (1844–1932), famous soldier and recipient of the Victoria Cross
 Mark Reynolds (basketball) (born 1984), Irish basketball player
 Osborne Reynolds (1842–1912), Irish physicist and engineer
 Patrick Reynolds (Cumann na nGaedhael) (1887–1932), father of Patrick J. Reynolds and an Irish Cumann na nGaedhael politician
 Patrick J. Reynolds (politician) (1920–2003), Irish politician who served three terms in Dáil Éireann and five in Seanad Éireann, where he was Cathaoirleach (speaker) for four years.

Welsh Reynolds

 Nicola Reynolds (born 1972), Welsh actress

Portuguese Reynolds

Originally from Maidstone, Kent, England, the first Reynolds that related to Portugal, Thomas Johnson William Reynolds, born in 1786, was a naval officer but withdrawn, settled later in Chatham, also in Kent, as an importer of fruit, wine corks and virgin cork from Spain and Portugal, until, because of a liver disease, on the advice of a doctor, that Reynolds began a sea voyage that brought him to Porto, where he saw a good opportunity to expand his business. With him came his sons, Thomas, William and Robert Hunter Reynolds, born respectively in 1811 and 1820. His daughter had already been born in Port Elizabeth in 1828.

Portugal proved to be a wealth of opportunities for these Reynolds. His son Robert, was the person that brought him to the Alentejo region, where he began his purchase of cork bark still on the tree, paying in advance, sometimes several years, with risk but with superb profits. Thus came the Alentejo and setting properties in Estremoz, accompanied by a nephew, son of Thomas, born in 1842, named William Reynolds.

People

People whose family name is or was Reynolds or one of its variants include:
Adam Reynolds (born 1990), Australian rugby league footballer
Alastair Reynolds (born 1966), Welsh science fiction author
Alexander Reynolds (1816–1876), American Army officer & Confederate general
Allie Reynolds (1917–1994), American Major League Baseball pitcher
Alvina Reynolds, Saint Lucian politician
Andrew Reynolds (disambiguation)
Anne Reynolds (d. 1634), English courtier
Barbara Reynolds (1914-2015), English scholar of Italian studies, lexicographer and translator
Bill Rennells (born 1931), British broadcaster and journalist
Bob Reynolds (disambiguation)
Brayley Reynolds (born 1935), Welsh footballer
Brian Reynolds (disambiguation)
Bryan Reynolds (born 1965), American performance theorist
Bryan Reynolds (born 1995), American professional baseball outfielder
Bryan Reynolds (born 2001), American professional soccer player
Burt Reynolds (1936–2018), American actor
Butch Reynolds (born 1964), American track star
Carl Reynolds (1903–1978), American Major League Baseball outfielder
Charles Reynolds (disambiguation)
Christopher Reynolds (disambiguation)
Corey Reynolds (born 1974), American actor
Craig Reynolds (disambiguation)
Dallas Reynolds (born 1984), American football player
Dan Reynolds (born 1987), American musician, frontman of the pop rock band Imagine Dragons
Daphne Reynolds (1918–2002), English painter and printmaker
Darius Reynolds (born 1989), American football player
David Reynolds (disambiguation)
Dean Reynolds (born 1963), English professional snooker player
Debbie Reynolds (1932–2016), American actress
Debby Reynolds (born 1952), former UK Chief Veterinary Officer
Deborah Reynolds (born 1953), U.S. politician
Dick Reynolds, American politician
DJ eL Reynolds (born Lee Martin Reynolds), English DJ/radio personality, also of Filipino descent
Don Reynolds (actor) (1937–2019), American actor
Donn Reynolds (1921–1997), Canadian country singer and world record yodeller
Douglas Reynolds (1882–1916), English recipient of the Victoria Cross
Ed Reynolds (safety) (born 1991), American football player
Elise Reynolds (born 1969), Dutch cricketer
Frank Reynolds (1923–1983), journalist for the American Broadcasting Company (ABC)
Gene Reynolds (1923–2020), American actor, television writer, director, and producer
Gene Reynolds (born 1950), Louisiana politician
George Reynolds (disambiguation)
Gerald Reynolds (disambiguation)
Gerry Reynolds (disambiguation)
Gladys H. Reynolds, American statistician
Hannah Reynolds (soccer) (born 1998), American soccer player
Harold Reynolds (born 1960), Major League Baseball second baseman
Henry Reynolds (disambiguation)
Hiram Reynolds (1854–1938), General Superintendent, Church of the Nazarene
Hubert Reynolds (1860–1938), American politician
Hunter Reynolds (1959–2022), American visual artist and AIDS activist
J. Sargeant Reynolds, US politician
James Reynolds (disambiguation)
Jack Reynolds (disambiguation)
Jalen Reynolds (born 1992), American basketball player for Maccabi Tel Aviv of the Israeli Basketball Premier League and Euroleague.
Jasper Reynolds, English footballer
Jeremiah N. Reynolds (1799–1858), newspaper editor, lecturer, explorer and author
Jerry Reynolds (disambiguation)
Joffrey Reynolds (born 1979), gridiron football player
John Reynolds (disambiguation)
John F. Reynolds, Union general in the American Civil War
Jonathan Reynolds, British politician
Jonathan Reynolds (writer), American writer
Joseph Reynolds (disambiguation)
Josh Reynolds (born 1989), Australian rugby league footballer
Josh Reynolds (American football) (born 1995), American football player
Joshua Reynolds (1723–1792), English painter
Joyce Reynolds (actress) (1924–2019), American film actress
Joyce K. Reynolds, American computer scientist
Kev Reynolds (1943-2021), English outdoor writer
Kevin Reynolds (disambiguation)
Kevin Reynolds (born 1952), American film director and screenwriter
Kevin Reynolds (born 1990), Canadian figure skater
Lacey Reynolds, American college basketball coach
Luke Reynolds, English singer/songwriter
Mack Reynolds (1917–1983), US pulp science fiction magazine author
Malvina Reynolds (1900–1978), American folk/blues singer-songwriter and political activist
Maria Hester Park (née Reynolds) (1760–1813), English keyboard player, composer and teacher
Mark Reynolds (disambiguation)
Matt Reynolds (infielder) (born 1990), American baseball player
Mel Reynolds (born 1952), US politician
Nick Reynolds (1933–2008), American folk musician, founding member of The Kingston Trio
Norman Reynolds, British Academy Award-winning art director
Osborne Reynolds (1842–1912), Irish physicist and engineer
Pam Reynolds, American musician who had a famous near-death experience
Patrick Reynolds (disambiguation)
Paul Reynolds (disambiguation)
Peter Reynolds (disambiguation)
Prue-Anne Reynalds, Australian cyclist
R. J. Reynolds (1850–1918), founder of R. J. Reynolds Tobacco Company
Ray Reynolds (born 1936), Australian cricketer
Richard Reynolds (disambiguation)
Robert Reynolds (disambiguation)
Rodney Reynolds (born 1974), American engineer
Roger Reynolds (born 1934), US composer
Roslyn Reynolds, English rugby league footballer of the 1940s and 1950s
Rose Reynolds, British actress
Roughton "Rou" Reynolds, lead singer/electronics in Enter Shikari; an English post-hardcore band
Ryan Reynolds (born 1976), Canadian actor
Samuel Reynolds (disambiguation)
Scottie Reynolds (born 1987), American basketball player
Shane Reynolds (born 1968), Major League Baseball pitcher
Sherman Reynolds (1878–1958), rancher and mayor of Chico, California from 1919 to 1923
Sidney Hugh Reynolds (1867–1949), English geologist
Simon Reynolds, British music critic
Stan Reynolds, Canadian businessman
Stan Reynolds, English jazz trumpeter
Tabor B. Reynolds (1821–1901), American physician and politician
Thomas Reynolds (disambiguation)
Tim Reynolds, guitarist
Tommie Reynolds (born 1941), Major League Baseball outfielder
Vernon Reynolds (born 1935), British anthropologist
Walter Reynolds (died 1327), Archbishop of Canterbury
Walter H. Reynolds (1901–1987), Mayor of Providence, Rhode Island
Wellington J. Reynolds (1865–1949), portrait painter and art instructor at the Art Institute of Chicago
William Reynolds (disambiguation)
The Reynolds Girls (Linda Reynolds, born 1970 and Aisling Reynolds, born 1972), English dance-pop duo

Fictional characters
Caroline Reynolds, a character from the television series Prison Break
  Lieutenant-Colonel Charles Reynolds, a character from the British sitcom It Ain't Half Hot Mum
Kate Reynolds, a fictional character from the movie The Family Man
Kate Reynolds, She has her own weekly news show. It's called "The World in Vision." – a fictional character from the movie Omen III: The Final Conflict
Kevin Reynolds, a fictional character from Canadian series, Supernoobs
Peter Reynolds, a fictional character from the movie Omen III: The Final Conflict
 Dennis, Deandra and Frank Reynolds, fictional characters who own an Irish pub in the TV series It's Always Sunny in Philadelphia
Matt Reynolds, a character from the movie L.A. Confidential.
Mrs. Reynolds, the Darcy's housekeeper in Jane Austen's Pride and Prejudice
Malcolm Reynolds, the captain of the ship Serenity in the TV series Firefly and the movie Serenity
Eileen Reynolds, Kate Rowan's aunt in the British TV series Heartbeat.

Other
Reynolds cycling team, Spanish professional cycling team

See also
Rennell (disambiguation)
Reynald (disambiguation)
McReynolds

Bibliography
PAINHA, José Maria. Chá de Azeite – O Trajecto Empresarial da Casa Reynolds no Alentejo e Extremadura (1838–1890). Estremoz:Câmara Municipal de Estremoz, 2008. .

References 

English-language surnames
Surnames of English origin
Surnames of Irish origin
Gaelic families of Norse descent
Patronymic surnames
People of Conmaicne Maigh Rein
People of Conmaicne Maigh Nissi